Badische Philharmonie Pforzheim  is the concert and opera orchestra at the Stadttheater Pforzheim, in Baden-Württemberg, Germany.

German orchestras